The 2015–16 European Rugby Challenge Cup pool stage was the first stage of competition in the second season of the European Rugby Challenge Cup.

It involved 20 teams competing, across 5 pools of 4 teams, for 8 quarter-final places – awarded to the 5 pool winners and the 3 top-ranked pool runners-up.

The pool stage began on 12 November 2015 but one game was postponed following the November 2015 Paris attacks. It is due to be completed on the weekend of 21–24 January 2016.

Seeding
The majority of teams were seeded based on their performance in the Premiership, the Pro12 and the Top 14. However, as the Premiership and Top 14 incorporate promotion and relegation into their competitions, three teams are seeded based on their performance in the Greene King IPA Championship and Pro D2 Leagues, having been promoted this season. Two final teams come from the Qualifying Competition involving emerging rugby nations, and some Italian Excellenza clubs.

Teams were then placed into 4 Tiers, each containing 5 teams, based on their seeding. A draw determined which two second seeded teams completed Tier 1, and based on this, the fourth seeded teams were allocated to either Tier 2 and Tier 3.

Given the nature of the Qualifying Competition, a competition including developing rugby nations and Italian clubs not competing in the Pro12, Rugby Europe 1 and Rugby Europe 2 are automatically included in Tier 4, despite officially being ranked 1/2 from that competition.

The brackets show each teams seeding and their league (for example, 1 Top 14 indicates the team has been seeded 1st from the Top 14).

Pool stage
The draw took place on 17 June 2015, at the Château de Neuchâtel, in Neuchâtel, Switzerland.

During the pool stage, the teams will play the 3 other teams in their pool twice, both at home and away, Based on the result of the match, teams receive:
 4 points for a win,
 2 points for a draw,
 1 attacking bonus point for scoring four or more tries in a match,
 1 defensive bonus point for losing a match by seven points or less.

Following the pool stage, the five winners from each group progress to the quarter-finals, along with the three best pool runners-up from the competition. In the event of a tie between two or more teams from the same pool, the following criteria were used as tie-breakers:
 The club with the greater number of competition points from only matches involving tied teams.
 If equal, the club with the best aggregate points difference from those matches.
 If equal, the club that scored the most tries in those matches.

If this did not separate teams, and/or the tie related to teams that did not play each other (i.e., in different pools), the following tie breakers were used:
 If equal, the club with the best aggregate points difference from the pool stage.
 The club that scored the most tries in the pool stage.
 If equal, the club with the fewest players suspended in the pool stage.
 If equal, the drawing of lots will determine a club's ranking.

Fixtures for the competition were announced on 14 August 2015, with the exception of Pool 1, due to a delay in agreeing a suitable 'home' stadium for Enisey-STM, who normally play in Krasnoyarsk, Siberia, where temperatures during tournament time can reach -20 °C. It was later agreed by the four teams in the pool that Enisey-STM would host only its Round 1 game in Krasnoyarsk, with the club's remaining two "home" matches to be held in the considerably warmer city of Sochi. A draw was held on 4 September 2015 at the EPCR headquarters in Neuchâtel to determine which club would travel to Krasnoyarsk, and Connacht was drawn as the Round 1 opponent.

Pool 1

Pool 2

Pool 3

Pool 4

Pool 5

See also
2015–16 European Rugby Challenge Cup

Notes

References

2015–16 European Rugby Challenge Cup
2015